Laaj may refer to:

 Laaj (film), a 2003 Pakistani Urdu-language film
 Laaj (TV series), a 2016 Pakistani romantic television series